Ivan Strugar (born December 18, 1974) is a Montenegrin kickboxer. He is a winner of numerous trophies and accolades both in amateur and professional competition, and is one of the most popular sportsmen in Montenegro. He currently fights in W.A.K.O Pro association, out of Ariston gym in Podgorica. He won his last match in Podgorica. He fought Beloni third time in his career, and lost the fight by third-round knockout.

Personal life
Strugar declares himself as Yugoslav, entering the ring in shirt with inscription Yugoslavia and FR Yugoslavia emblem, the same shirt he wore at W.A.K.O. European Championships 1996, where he won gold medal and entered the ring in same shirt since then, always accompanied by the song Eye of the Tiger.

Titles

Professional competition
2014 W.A.K.O. Pro Low Kick Rules Heavyweight World Champion -88,6 kg.
2010 W.A.K.O. Pro Low Kick Rules Heavyweight World Champion -88,6 kg. (1 title def.)
2009 W.A.K.O. Pro Low Kick Rules Cruises Light Heavyweight World Champion -85,1 kg. (1 title def.)
2007 W.A.K.O. Pro Low Kick Rules Cruises Light Heavyweight World Champion -85,1 kg.
2003 Kings Of The Ring - Oriental Kickboxing Rules Super World Champion -85 kg.
2002 W.A.K.O. Pro Low Kick Rules Light Heavyweight World Champion -81,4 kg.
2001 W.A.K.O. Pro Low Kick Rules Super Middleweight World Champion -78.1 kg.
1998 W.A.K.O. Pro Low Kick Rules Middleweight World Champion -75 kg.

Amateur competition

2001 W.A.K.O. World Championships in Belgrade, Serbia & Montenegro  -81 kg (Low-Kick)
2000 W.A.K.O. European Championships in Jesolo, Italy  -75 kg (Low-Kick)
1999 W.A.K.O. World Championships in Bishkek, Kyrgyzstan  -75 kg
1998 W.A.K.O. European Championships in Kiev, Ukraine  -75 kg
1996 W.A.K.O. European Championships in Belgrade, Serbia & Montenegro  -71 kg (Low-Kick)
1995 W.A.K.O. World Championships in Kiev, Ukraine  -71 kg
1994 W.A.K.O. European Championships in Lisbon, Portugal  -71 kg

Accolades

 1999 Best sportsman of Podgorica
 1996 Best sportsman of Montenegro
 1995, 1998, 1999, 2000, 2001 among ten best sportsmen of Federal Republic of Yugoslavia

Kickboxing Record

|-
|-  bgcolor="#CCFFCC"
| 2014-03-07 || Win ||align=left| Kiril Ivanov  || Splendid Grand Prix 6 || Budva, Montenegro || Decision (Unanimous) || 5 || 3:00
|-
! style=background:white colspan=9 |
|- 
|-  bgcolor="#FFBBBB"
| 2012-06-16 || Loss ||align=left| Frédérique Bellonie  || W.A.K.O. Pro GP Serbia vs Russia || Belgrade, Serbia || TKO || 3 || 
|-
! style=background:white colspan=9 |
|- 
|-  bgcolor="#CCFFCC"
| 2011-12-16 || Win ||align=left| Yassine Ahaggan  || Splendid Grand Prix 5  || Budva, Montenegro || Decision (Unanimous) || 5 || 3:00
|-  bgcolor="#FFBBBB"
| 2011-04-15 || Loss ||align=left| Frédérique Bellonie  || Strugar - Bellonie  || Podgorica, Montenegro || Decision (Split) || 5 || 3:00
|-
! style=background:white colspan=9 |
|- 
|-  bgcolor="#CCFFCC"
| 2010-12-17 || Win ||align=left| Alan Kotsoev  || Splendid Grand Prix 2010  || Budva, Montenegro || KO (Right High Kick) || 5 || 
|-
! style=background:white colspan=9 |
|- 
|-  bgcolor="#CCFFCC"
| 2010-06-10 || Win ||align=left| Cedrick Copra  || Meč za titulu profesionalnog šampiona svijeta || Bijelo Polje, Montenegro || Decision (Unanimous) || 5 || 3:00
|-
! style=background:white colspan=9 |
|- 
|-  bgcolor="#CCFFCC"
| 2009-12-11 || Win ||align=left| Mehmet Özer || Grand Prix Budva  || Budva, Montenegro || TKO (Retirement) || 4 || 
|-
! style=background:white colspan=9 |
|- 
|-  bgcolor="#CCFFCC"
| 2009-05-26 || Win ||align=left| Salko Zildžić || Konačni Obračun  || Podgorica, Montenegro || KO (Right High Kick) || 4 || 
|-
! style=background:white colspan=9 |
|- 
|-  bgcolor="#CCFFCC"
| 2008-12-12 || Win ||align=left| Hassan Boau || Splendid Grad Prix 2 || Budva, Montenegro || Decision (Unanimous) || 5 || 3:00
|-  bgcolor="#FFBBBB"
| 2008-05-09 || Loss ||align=left| Salko Zildžić || Strugar - Zildžić 2 || Tuzla, Bosnia and Herzegovina || KO (Left Hook) || 4 || 
|-
! style=background:white colspan=9 |
|- 
|-  bgcolor="#CCFFCC"
| 2007-12-15 || Win ||align=left| Salko Zildžić || Strugar - Zildžić 1 || Budva, Montenegro || Decision (Unanimous) || 5 || 3:00
|-
! style=background:white colspan=9 |
|- 
|-  bgcolor="#CCFFCC"
| 2007-07-05 || Win ||align=left| Oleg Utenin ||  || Budva, Montenegro || Decision (Unanimous) || 5 || 3:00
|-
! style=background:white colspan=9 |
|- 
|-  bgcolor="#CCFFCC"
| 2007-04-14 || Win ||align=left| Vladimir Mitjakin  ||  || Podgorica, Montenegro || KO (Right High Kick) || 5 || 
|-
|-  bgcolor="#CCFFCC"
| 2006-06-02 || Win ||align=left| Draženko Ninić ||  || Novi Sad, Serbia || Decision (Unanimous) || 12 || 2:00
|-
! style=background:white colspan=9 |
|- 
|-  bgcolor="#CCFFCC"
| 2006-04-07 || Win ||align=left| Draženko Ninić || Noć Šampiona || Banja Luka, Bosnia and Herzegovina || Decision (Split) || 12 || 2:00
|-
! style=background:white colspan=9 |
|- 
|-  bgcolor="#FFBBBB"
| 2005-07-02 || Loss ||align=left| Frédérique Bellonie || Le Grand Tournoi 2005, Semi finals || Paris, France || Decision || 3 || 3:00
|-  bgcolor="#CCFFCC"
| 2005-07-02 || Win ||align=left| Aziz Jahjah || Le Grand Tournoi 2005, Quarter finals || Paris, France || Decision || 3 || 3:00
|-  bgcolor="#CCFFCC"
| 2005-06-04 || Win ||align=left| Leonard Sitpholek || Kings Of The Ring: Mission Impossible, Final || Zagreb, Croatia || KO || 2 || 
|-
! style=background:white colspan=9 |
|- 
|-  bgcolor="#CCFFCC"
| 2005-06-04 || Win ||align=left| Jiri Jaros || Kings Of The Ring: Mission Impossible, Semi Finals || Zagreb, Croatia || Decision || 3 || 3:00
|-
|-  bgcolor="#FFBBBB"
| 2004-06-05 || Loss ||align=left| Aziz Jahjah || La Finale Du Grand Tournoi, Semi finals || Paris, France || Decision (Split)  || 3 || 3:00
|-  bgcolor="#CCFFCC"
| 2004-06-05 || Win ||align=left| Aurélien Duarte || La Finale Du Grand Tournoi, Quarter finals || Paris, France || Decision (Unanimous)  || 3 || 3:00
|-  bgcolor="#CCFFCC"
| 2003-12-13 || Win ||align=left| Aurélien Duarte || Kings Of The Ring || Milano, Italy || Decision (Unanimous) || 5 || 3:00
|-
! style=background:white colspan=9 |
|- 
|-  bgcolor="#CCFFCC"
| 2002-?-? || Win ||align=left| Gerson Teixeira ||  ||  ||  ||  || 
|-
! style=background:white colspan=9 |
|- 
|-  bgcolor="#CCFFCC"
| 2001-?-? || Win ||align=left| Eric Perros ||  ||  ||  ||  || 
|-
! style=background:white colspan=9 |
|- 
|-  bgcolor="#CCFFCC"
| 1998-?-? || Win ||align=left| Daniele Petroni ||  ||  ||  ||  || 
|-
! style=background:white colspan=9 |
|- 
|-  bgcolor="#CCFFCC"
| 1996-01-22 || Win ||align=left| Milovan Dašić ||  || Cetinje, Yugoslav Federal Republic ||  ||  || 
|-
! style=background:white colspan=9 |
|- 
|-
| colspan=9 | Legend:

See also 
List of male kickboxers

References

External links 
Ivan Strugar Official Website

Montenegrin male kickboxers
Cruiserweight kickboxers
Sportspeople from Podgorica
1974 births
Living people
Serbian male kickboxers
Serbs of Montenegro